Murica may refer to:

 Murica (album), by American rock band Filter
 'Murica, a slang term referring to the United States (wiktionary: 'Murica)

See also
 Merica, a genus of sea snails